"Light Up the World" is a song performed by the cast of American television series Glee, taken from their eight soundtrack album, Glee: The Music, Volume 6. The song was written by the series' music producer Adam Anders, Swedish pop music producer Max Martin, and Peer Åström, Savan Kotecha, and Johan Schuster. Anders and Martin produced the track. The song features solos from Naya Rivera (Santana Lopez), Heather Morris (Brittany Pierce), Kevin McHale (Artie Abrams), Lea Michele (Rachel Berry), Cory Monteith (Finn Hudson), and Jenna Ushkowitz (Tina Cohen-Chang).

Charts

References

2011 singles
Songs written by Max Martin
Songs written by Savan Kotecha
Songs written by Peer Åström
Songs written by Adam Anders
Songs written by Shellback (record producer)
2011 songs
Songs from television series
Song recordings produced by Max Martin
Columbia Records singles
Dance-pop songs
Pop rock songs